The Pinkprint is the third studio album by rapper Nicki Minaj, released on December 15, 2014, by Young Money Entertainment, Cash Money Records and Republic Records. Minaj co-executive-produced the album alongside Birdman, Lil Wayne and Ronald Williams, with a variety of producers who produced the album's sound. Looking to depart from the dance-pop elements of her second studio album, Pink Friday: Roman Reloaded (2012), The Pinkprint is a follow-up record influenced by her traditional hip hop beginnings.

Upon its release, The Pinkprint received generally positive reviews from music critics, with many of them praising its production and personal lyrics. Among best of the decade lists, it landed 166 on Pitchfork and 60 on Rolling Stone. The album reached number two on the US Billboard 200 with 244,000 album-equivalent units in its first week, of which 198,000 were pure sales. In the United Kingdom, The Pinkprint opened at number 22 on the UK Albums Chart. As of December 2015, the record has sold 682,000 pure copies in the United States, and has since been certified 2× Platinum by the Recording Industry Association of America (RIAA) by adding streaming and track sales equivalent. The Pinkprint received a Grammy nomination for Best Rap Album in 2016. 

The Pinkprint spawned the singles: "Pills n Potions", "Anaconda", "Only", "Bed of Lies", "Truffle Butter", and "The Night Is Still Young". The second single, Anaconda, peaked at number two on the Billboard Hot 100 becoming Minaj's highest charting single at the time, while four other singles peaked within the top 40 of the Hot 100. To further promote the album, Minaj embarked on her third concert tour, titled The Pinkprint Tour, which commenced in March 2015 and ended in August 2015, spanning more than fifty shows over the five month period.

Background and production

In 2013, Minaj stated that she would begin writing material for the project later that year, after production was completed for her supporting role in her first feature film The Other Woman (2014). Minaj noted that there were currently no featured artists on the record, and commented that she was "just enjoying [the] creative process". Recording sessions for the album took place at Jungle City Studios New York, NY; Evdon Studios, Toronto, Canada; Glenwood Recording Studios, Burbank, CA; Luke's In The Boo, Malibu, CA; Record Plant, Hollywood, CA, Conway Recording Studios, Los Angeles, CA; and Eightysevenfourteen Studios, Los Angeles, CA. In November 2013, Minaj described the project as "next level", "very different from anything I've done", and made clear that she just experimented with pop music but never had the intention to continue with the genre. She also stated that she is still "hungry" and just because she's had a successful career that wouldn't stop her from giving the fans what they wanted.

During the recording process Minaj recorded two songs that were inspired by Irish Celtic singer-songwriter Enya; Minaj stated that the songs contain "airiness and the whimsicalness" that reminded her of Enya. In 2014, singer-songwriter Skylar Grey wrote and recorded a demo version of a song entitled "Bed of Lies" and the song was later sent to Minaj who wrote and recorded verses of her own to the song. In August 2014, Minaj's manager informed her that Beyoncé wanted to make a remix of "Flawless" with her and in return she would feature on The Pinkprint. Minaj said that she wrote her verse in New York and Beyoncé visited her in the studio and encouraged her. During the album's production, Minaj worked with a variety of people including Dr. Luke, Ester Dean, Boi-1da and Detail. Minaj also hoped to have guest features from Rihanna and Drake. While Rihanna did not appear on the album, Drake was featured on two songs from the album, along with fellow Young Money labelmate Lil Wayne, on "Only" and "Truffle Butter", with the latter appearing exclusively on the deluxe edition of the album.

In September, Minaj stated that "it was her best album to date" saying she had grown as a writer and was able to speak about topics that she had felt uncomfortable sharing two years ago. Later that month, Minaj characterized the album as consisting of "raw talent, emotion, hard spitting and everything that people have come to love about Nicki Minaj". In November 2014, Minaj revealed she had recorded 25 songs for the album, stating she would find a song that "sits" with her and then mold that track for a while until she was satisfied; she continued to say her biggest problem during the recording process was cutting songs from the final track listing as each track was "special" to her. In November 2014, Minaj described the record as "personal" and an "emotional rollercoaster" to MTV News.

Music and lyrics

Speaking on the album's musical style, Minaj stated that the album would "focus on rap" and "feed the core rap fan", whereas Pink Friday: Roman Reloaded explored more prominent elements of dance music. In April 2014, Minaj told MTV News "the tracks on [my next album] are back to my hip-hop roots. And I don't think it's something that I'm necessarily trying to do [but] as soon as I started working on my new album, that's just the songs that I've been writing". Minaj stated the album's lyrics touch upon themes of her family, loss, death and her struggle with guilt. The Pinkprint opens with the autobiographical song, "All Things Go", which was described as a sequel to Minaj's song "Autobiography" off her Sucka Free mixtape in 2008. A mid-tempo ballad, which slowly unfolds and contains "heavy beats and heavy bass" along with "subtle synths". The lyrics discuss a wide range of personal issues Minaj has faced, from reflecting on fame and the speed in which her life has moved, to strained relationships with her family including the murder of her cousin Nicholas Telemaque, to her relationship with her mother and her own child which references an abortion. "I Lied" is a ballad that contains a torpid production that does not change tempo. Lyrically, the song revolves around a "complicated regret" in which Minaj admits she denied her love for a man in order to stop him from breaking her heart. "The Crying Game" features initially uncredited vocals from British musician Jessie Ware, before being officially credited at a later date. The song mixes "sombre balladry with downbeat guitar loops" and is described as one of the album's most emotional songs. During the song, Minaj alternates between "devastating verses and pensive crooning" whilst Ware adds "haunting" and "soulful" vocals to the chorus. During an interview for Malcolm Music, Ware revealed how the collaboration came about, saying that she wrote the song with Pop Wansel for her own album Tough Love (2014) but ultimately felt that it didn't fit the album. Wansel subsequently sent the song to Minaj who recorded her own vocals to turn the song into a collaboration between Ware and Minaj. Initial pressings of the album did not list Ware as being featured; something Ware added was a mistake and later corrected.

"Get on Your Knees" features vocals from American singer Ariana Grande. Minaj raps in a "trance-like" style as she demands things from her male partner, which hints at oral sex, and is described as a "fetish obsession with seeing their man on all fours". "Feeling Myself" features singer-songwriter Beyoncé, and is built over a West Coast synth, driving bass and drums along with bells and whistles incorporated into the production. "Only" is a hip-hop song that features guest appearances from Drake, Lil Wayne, and Chris Brown who sings the chorus of the song. The song contains an "icy" production that sits "ominously" underneath dirty lyrical metaphors. "Want Some More" (with uncredited vocals from Jeremih) features lyrics that see Minaj stroking her own ego and check anyone who dares to doubt her worth. During the song, Minaj makes references to Eminem, Kanye West and Lil Wayne and states she is her "only competition". "Four Door Aventador" has humming and low-key production with lyrics revolving around mafia imagery. The song is compared to the work of the Notorious B.I.G.

"Favorite" features American R&B singer Jeremih and is a return to a "romantic narrative" following the four previous songs which features Minaj bragging. The song is lyrically sexually explicit and sees Jeremih singing about wanting to be Nicki's favorite. Minaj raps about wanting to be the "primary role in a man's life". "Buy a Heart" features rapper Meek Mill, who sings the hook of the song. "Trini Dem Girls" is a dancehall track that features a guest appearance from rapper LunchMoney Lewis. The song contains echoing handclaps and a "Diwali Riddim" with a "blaring" chorus. "Anaconda" is a hip-hop and pop-rap song that heavily samples "Baby Got Back" by Sir Mix-a-Lot. The song's lyrical content is described as "raunchy" and noted for containing a "heavy dose of 2014 sex lingo". "The Night Is Still Young" is a pop song with verses revolving around a routine night out at a club.

The lead single, "Pills n Potions" is a slow-burning piano ballad that contains prominent elements of hip hop, R&B and pop. The song opens with a sparse, haunting drum beat, while Minaj sings the pre-chorus in a feather-like near-whisper. As the song's pre-chorus repeats, an echo effect is added to her vocals, and "blooming" chants are sung to create the song's chorus. The song's lyrics revolve around someone who has wronged her but she still loves. "Bed of Lies" features guest vocals from singer-songwriter Skylar Grey and is a slow-tempo song built over triumphant production, pianos, rolling drums and booming bass. The song opens with Grey's chorus and a restrained keyboard set before Minaj begins to rap about an ex-lover. "Grand Piano" is the final song on the album's standard version and is the only song on the album that is not a hip hop song; it features no rapping from Minaj nor drums are played in the song. The song is a ballad that contains pianos and violins, with lyrics revolving around Minaj "feeling stupid" and feeling "played" by a former lover.

Singles
"Pills n Potions" was released as the lead single from the album on May 21, 2014. Minaj announced the release at the 2014 Billboard Music Awards. The song peaked at number 24 on the US Billboard Hot 100.

"Anaconda" was released as the second single from the album on August 4, 2014. The song samples Sir Mix-a-Lot's "Baby Got Back" and peaked at number two on the Billboard Hot 100, becoming Minaj's highest-charting single in the US at the time. It topped both the Hot R&B/Hip-Hop Songs and the Hot Rap Songs charts for six weeks. Additionally, the song peaked within the top ten in countries including Australia, Canada, Ireland, New Zealand and the United Kingdom.

"Only", which features Drake, Lil Wayne and Chris Brown, was released as the third single from the album on October 28, 2014. The song peaked at number 12 on the Billboard Hot 100 and topped the Hot R&B/Hip-Hop Songs.

"Bed of Lies" featuring Skylar Grey was released as the fourth single from the album on November 16, 2014. Minaj debuted the song at the 2014 MTV Europe Music Awards. The song peaked at number 62 on the Billboard Hot 100. "

"Truffle Butter" featuring Drake and Lil Wayne was released separately from the album to iTunes and Spotify on January 23, 2015, after initially being an iTunes exclusive bonus track, and was serviced to US radio on March 3, 2015 as the fifth single from the album. The song peaked at number 14 on the Billboard Hot 100.

"The Night Is Still Young" was officially released in the UK on April 12, 2015 and later in the US on April 28, 2015, as the sixth single from the album, and has peaked at number 31 on the Billboard Hot 100.

According to FMQB and Republic Records, "Trini Dem Girls", featuring LunchMoney Lewis, impacted US radio stations on September 1, 2015.

Packaging and title
The album was officially announced to be titled The Pinkprint with the premiere of the track "Lookin Ass" along with its Nabil Elderkin-directed music video on February 12, 2014. Its title reportedly references The Blueprint (2001) by Jay-Z, to which Minaj replied that "I think everybody knows how obsessed I am with Jay-Z. He's always been my favorite rapper", also adding that, "He did such a great job of creating this Blueprint brand for male rappers and I wanted to do that [for] female rappers to be able to pattern themselves with what I've done one day". During an interview with Complex magazine, Minaj was asked if Jay-Z's The Blueprint inspired the title to The Pinkprint and what similarities there were, which Minaj replied saying;

On November 2, 2014, Minaj released the album's artwork, which was created by Joe Perez's design studio, who works for Kanye West's creative team Donda, who had previously designed artwork for Lil Wayne and 2 Chainz. It displays a "sandy" textured pink "splatter" with a thumbprint placed in the middle of a black background on the standard version and a white background for the deluxe version. On December 1, 2014, the track listing was released to the public, and confirmed collaborations with Ariana Grande, Beyoncé, Drake, Lil Wayne, Chris Brown, Jeremih, Meek Mill, LunchMoney Lewis, Jessie Ware and Skylar Grey.

Release and promotion

In August 2014, Minaj confirmed that the album would be released in the fourth quarter of the year. In September 2014, Minaj announced through her Twitter account that the album would be released on November 24, 2014. In late October, her management announced that the album had been rescheduled for release on December 15. The album was made available for pre-order on iTunes on December 3, 2014 with the intro track "All Things Go" as an instant download.
The standard version of The Pinkprint features sixteen songs, while the deluxe version is packaged with three additional tracks. American retailer Best Buy packaged the latter edition with a smaller version of Minaj's 2015 calendar. "Truffle Butter" and "Wamables" are respectively included as the twentieth songs on the iTunes Store and Japanese pressings of the record. A fifth deluxe variant (distributed by American retailer Target and the United Kingdom) lists "Mona Lisa" and "Put You in a Room" as the twentieth and twenty-first tracks, although most of the tracks on this version are abbreviated to fit the exclusive material. During the first week of retail availability, it was discovered that physical deluxe versions of The Pinkprint were unintentionally shipped worldwide with an instrumental version of "Anaconda" instead of the original track.

In contrast to the vibrantly-colored wardrobe and hairpieces she had become associated with earlier in her career, Minaj embraced a more understated image during the first promotional runs for The Pinkprint. She opined that "You can either continue doing costumes or you can just say, 'Hey guess what? This will shock them even more. Doing nothing will shock them even more'". On August 24, 2014, Minaj performed “Anaconda” at the MTV Video Music Awards. She also performed at that year's iHeartRadio Music Festival on September 19. On November 9, 2014, Minaj performed a medley of "Super Bass", "Anaconda", and "Bed of Lies" at the MTV Europe Music Awards, and also hosted the show. On November 23, 2014, Minaj performed "Bed of Lies" at the American Music Awards. On December 6, 2014, Minaj appeared as a musical guest on an episode of NBC's Saturday Night Live alongside host James Franco. She performed three songs from the album: "Bed of Lies", "Only" and "All Things Go". She also participated in a few skits. During album release week, Minaj visited a few talk shows in promotion for the album. On December 15, Minaj appeared on The Ellen DeGeneres Show for an interview and also performed "Bed of Lies". On December 16, Minaj appeared on The Today Show for an interview and another performance. That same night, she appeared on The Tonight Show Starring Jimmy Fallon for an interview. On December 18, Minaj appeared on 106 & Park as the show's final guest artist to discuss the album and the show's legacy. On December 19, Minaj appeared on The Real for an interview. On January 18, 2015, MTV aired My Time Again, a documentary filmed during the final stages of the making of The Pinkprint, which featured behind the scenes clips of Minaj in the studio and in rehearsals, and interviews with Minaj and footage of her with her family. In May 2015, she performed "The Night Is Still Young" and "Hey Mama" at the Billboard Music Awards. Minaj also opened the 2015 MTV Video Music Awards with a performance of "Trini Dem Girls", then "The Night Is Still Young" and "Bad Blood" with Taylor Swift.

Minaj supported the album with a 17-date European tour which commenced on March 16, 2015 in Stockholm, Sweden and stopped off in Ireland, the United Kingdom, Norway, Germany, France, Belgium and the Netherlands before ending on April 12, 2015 in Glasgow, Scotland. Trey Songz was the opening act.

Critical reception

The Pinkprint received generally positive reviews from critics with many praising the production and her personal lyrics. At Metacritic, which assigns a normalized rating out of 100 to reviews from mainstream critics, the album received an average score of 70 based on 25 reviews, indicating "generally positive reviews."  

Billboard magazine's Niki McGloster called it "her best album to date. Minaj was finally able to out-rap herself and purge issues she's struggled with in private in her most exposed fashion yet". Sheldon Pearce of The A.V. Club thought that The Pinkprint is "the closest Nicki Minaj has ever gotten to balancing her tendencies". Randall Roberts from the Los Angeles Times wrote that throughout the album, "she's intent on channeling her talent to explore and document her many moods. The combination is often, if not always, intoxicating". In Cuepoint, Robert Christgau commended most of her vulnerable ballads and their "narrative arc", but felt the album is defined more so by the bonus tracks, particularly "Shanghai" and "Win Again", where "Minaj returns to her triumphalist mode prepared to embrace the role of a 32-year-old woman ready for love—even, in both songs, the motherhood she reflects on as the record begins." Pitchfork editor Meaghan Garvey said the last series of songs, including the bonus tracks, comprise "a thrilling, confounding six-song set that elevates The Pinkprint from an occasionally transcendent break-up album to something far more intriguing," and added "the album presented Minaj in her most unexpected role yet: a human being."

In a less enthusiastic review, Spin magazine's Brennan Carley felt the more emotionally vulnerable songs were counterintuitive to the album's success: "Minaj forces herself into her own box, muting her own strengths and songwriting abilities in favor of excising her emotional demons." Jon Caramanica of The New York Times, who found the album to be "full of compromises and half-successes", wrote that Minaj is a less impressive rapper on the more sincere songs where her flow is more measured and plain-spoken: "As a rapper, she's capable of grand technical feats, rapid cadence switching and complex rhyme patterns, but generally she puts those fireworks to the side when diving deep into her feelings." Kyle Anderson of Entertainment Weekly was more critical and panned the ballads as "ponderous".

Accolades

Commercial performance
The Pinkprint debuted at number two on the US Billboard 200, with 244,000 album-equivalent units (with 198,000 coming from pure sales and 46,000 combined track-equivalent units and streams) in its first week behind Taylor Swift's 1989 which was spending its sixth week at number one. The album was streamed 16.8 million times across all on-demand streaming services in the United States during its first week. In its second week on the chart, the album stayed at number two moving an additional 156,000 units, which included 105,000 pure sales.The Pinkprint held the number two position for three weeks before falling to number three on the Billboard 200. As of December 2015, the album has sold 682,000 copies in the United States. In February 2016, the RIAA certified the album double platinum, for combined album sales, on-demand audio, video streams, and track sales equivalent of two million album-equivalent units.

Track listing

Notes
  signifies a co-producer
  signifies an additional vocal producer
 Some initial physical copies of the album missed out Jessie Ware on "The Crying Game" due to a printing mistake.
 "Want Some More" contains additional vocals by Jeremih.
 "Shanghai" contains additional vocals by Yung Berg.
 "Buy a Heart" contains excerpts of "Stay" performed by Henry Krinkle and "Un-Thinkable (I'm Ready)" performed by Alicia Keys.
 "Anaconda" contains a sample of "Baby Got Back" performed by Sir Mix-a-Lot.
 "Grand Piano" contains interpolations from "Rush Rush", written by Peter Lord and performed by Paula Abdul.
 "Truffle Butter" contains a sample of "What They Say" performed by Maya Jane Coles.
 In order to fit more songs on the disc, the majority of the tracks on the physical international deluxe version are shortened edits, and appear in their full length on the standard version of the album.

Personnel
Credits adapted from AllMusic.

Performance

Nicki Minaj – primary artist
Beyoncé – featured artist
Chris Brown – featured artist
Drake – featured artist
Ariana Grande – featured artist
Skylar Grey – featured artist
Jeremih – featured artist
LunchMoney Lewis – featured artist
Lil Wayne – featured artist
Meek Mill – featured artist
Jessie Ware – featured artist
Parker Ighile – featured artist (uncredited)
Lukasz Gottwald – vocals
Theron Thomas – vocals
Henry Walter – vocals
Ester Dean – vocals
Candice Boyd – vocals (background)
Katy Perry – vocals (background)

Production

Dwayne Carter – executive producer
Bryan "Birdman" Williams – executive producer
Ronald "Slim" Williams – executive producer
Nicki Minaj – co-executive producer
A.C.
Anonymous
Arch tha Boss
Boi-1da
Darhyl "DJ" Camper Jr.
Cirkut
Da Internz
DJ Spydr
Dr. Luke
Steve Mostyn
Keith Harris
Hit-Boy
Hitmaka
Rob Holladay
Parker Ighile
Breyan Stanley Isaac
JMIKE
Johnny Juliano
Kane Beatz
Alex da Kid
The Mad Violinist
Metro Boomin
Mike Will Made-It
Nineteen85
Polow da Don
Allen Ritter
Sak Pase
Skooly
T.O.D.A.Y
Vinylz
Pop & Oak
will.i.am
Yung Exclusive
Zaytoven

Technical

A.C. – instrumentation, programming
John Armstrong – recording assistant
Chris Athens – mastering
Todd Bergman – engineer, recording assistant
Boi-1da – instrumentation
Noel Cadastre – engineer
Cirkut – instrumentation, programming
John Cranfield – recording assistant
Aubry "Big Juice" Delaine – engineer, mixing
Dr. Luke – instrumentation, programming
Rachael Findlen – engineer, recording assistant
Ashanti "The Mad Violinist" Floyd – strings
Serban Ghenea – mixing
Clint Gibbs – engineer
John Hanes – engineer, mixing
Jaycen Joshua – mixing
JMIKE – instrumentation, programming
Dustin Kapulong – recording assistant
Ryan Kaul – mixing assistant
Caleb Laven – vocal editing
Omar Loya – engineer
Fabian Marasciullo – mixing
Manny Marroquin – mixing
Cameron Montgomery – recording assistant
Irene Richter – production coordination
Allen Ritter – instrumentation
Ramon Rivas – recording assistant
Tim Roberts – mixing assistant
Phil Seaford – mixing assistant
Ben Sedano – recording assistant
Brandon Mr. B Speed – engineer
Brian Springer – engineer
Chris Tabron – engineer
Vinylz – instrumentation
Stuart White – engineer
Daniel Zaidenstadt – engineer

Charts

Weekly charts

Year-end charts

Decade-end charts

Certifications

Release history

See also
List of Billboard number-one rap albums of 2015

References

External links
 
 

2014 albums
Albums produced by Cardo
Albums produced by Boi-1da
Albums produced by Hit-Boy
Albums produced by Cirkut
Albums produced by Dr. Luke
Albums produced by Polow da Don
Cash Money Records albums
Nicki Minaj albums
Young Money Entertainment albums
Albums produced by Zaytoven
Albums produced by Vinylz
Albums produced by Allen Ritter
Albums produced by Beyoncé
Albums produced by Da Internz
Albums produced by Oak Felder